Scott Coe (born March 16, 1980 in Winnipeg, Manitoba) is a former professional Canadian football linebacker. He was drafted by the Hamilton Tiger-Cats in the fifth round of the 2002 CFL Draft. He played high school football at Kelvin High School and college football at Manitoba.

Coe has also played for the Calgary Stampeders and Edmonton Eskimos.

References

External links
JustSportsStats bio

1980 births
Living people
Calgary Stampeders players
Canadian football linebackers
Edmonton Elks players
Hamilton Tiger-Cats players
Manitoba Bisons football players
Canadian football people from Winnipeg
Players of Canadian football from Manitoba